Rafael Nadal defeated José Acasuso in the final, 6–3, 6–4 to win the Singles title at the 2004 Idea Prokom Open. It was his first career title.

Guillermo Coria was the reigning champion, but did not participate.

Seeds

Draw

Finals

Top half

Bottom half

References
Main Draw

Orange Warsaw Open
2004 ATP Tour